Eurovision Choir 2019 was the second Eurovision Choir competition for choral singers, organised by the European Broadcasting Union (EBU) and Interkultur. It was held on 3 August 2019, at the Partille Arena, in Partille Municipality, Metropolitan Gothenburg, Sweden. The event, presented by Petroc Trelawny and Ella Petersson, was produced by Swedish host broadcaster Sveriges Television (SVT) together with an international team of EBU members, the European Choir Games and the City of Gothenburg.

Vocal Line of Denmark won the contest, with Latvia and Slovenia placing second and third respectively.

Location

Gothenburg is the second-largest city in Sweden and the fifth-largest in the Nordic countries.

Venue
After initial reports in February 2018, it was confirmed on 8 July 2018 that the second edition of the Eurovision Choir would be held in the Swedish city of Gothenburg. The proposed venue was the 14,000-seat Scandinavium arena. However, on 18 December 2018, it was confirmed that Partille Arena would host the competition.

Format
Competing countries who are members of the European Broadcasting Union (EBU) are eligible to participate in Eurovision Choir. Ten countries participated at the second edition of the contest. Each competing country was represented by a professional choir, and in the first round each performed a choral piece lasting no more than four minutes in length. Each piece may include singular or several musical works or of a free genre; but must contain national or regional influence from the participating country. Three choirs are invited to perform a second, 3 minute set after which the winner is announced.

The winning choir were presented with a trophy and awarded with a trip to attend the 11th edition of the World Choir Games held in Flanders, Belgium in July 2020.

Performances
The show opened with a performance by twenty one choirs from across Västra Götaland County, and all ten participating choirs performed "Mamma Mia" by ABBA during the flag parade. For the two intervals, the mass choir performed "Without You" by Avicii with Madelene Johansson after the first round, followed by 2017 winners Carmen Manet performing alongside Bohuslän Big Band after the second. At the end of the show all the choirs performed two further ABBA songs, "Dancing Queen" and "Thank You for the Music" both with Johansson.

Presenters
On 5 April 2019, it was announced that British classical music radio and television broadcaster, Petroc Trelawny and Swedish culture presenter  would host the 2019 competition. Trelawny’s career started at BBC Radio Devon in 1989 as a reporter and, since 1998, he has been a presenter at BBC Radio 3. Trelawny hosted the Eurovision Young Musicians 2018 at the Usher Hall in Edinburgh alongside Josie D'Arby.

Participating countries
The official list of participants was published on 18 December 2018 and included nine countries.

On 20 March 2019, it was announced that Denmark would ultimately participate for a second time, raising the number of participants to ten. Romania and France were originally announced as debut participants but were later removed from the official list published by the EBU.

First round

Second round
Three choirs advanced to the second round and performed a second, 3 minute set, after which the winner was announced.

Conductors
The conductors for each country were as follows:

  – Nicolas Dorian
  – Jens Johansen
  – Tono Wissing
  – Jānis Ozols
  – Gro Espedal
  – Joy Dunlop
  – Jasna Žitnik
  – Rasmus Krigström
  – Antoine Krattinger
  – Islwyn Evans

International broadcasts and voting

Commentators 
Most of the participating countries sent commentators to Gothenburg or commentated from their own country, in order to add insight to the participants.

Professional jury
The winner of the contest was decided upon the votes from a professional jury, which was made up of the following:

   – singer and composer, founding member of a cappella ensemble, The Real Group
  John Rutter – composer and conductor, was also a judge in 
  Deke Sharon – singer, director, producer, composer and arranger

The jury was asked to score on the technical skill and accuracy of the choir, the quality of their sound, their musicianship and interpretation and the communication of the piece they performed.

Other countries
 – On 16 November 2018, Estonian broadcaster Eesti Rahvusringhääling (ERR) confirmed that they would withdraw from the contest.
 – French broadcaster France Télévisions was originally announced as a debut participant but later withdrew from the competition due to logistical problems with the selected choir.
 – Despite their participation being initially confirmed, on 18 December 2018 the final list of countries did not include Romania. It was later revealed that the Romanian broadcaster Televiziunea Română (TVR) had declined an invitation to participate.
  – RTVE confirmed to news outlet ESCplus España that they would not broadcast the contest in any way, but that they were considering a 2021 debut depending on the time they have to prepare the entry and the interest.

The following countries participated in 2017, however did not appear in the final list of participants.

See also 
 Eurovision Song Contest 2019
 Junior Eurovision Song Contest 2019

References

External links 
 

Eurovision Choir
2019 in Sweden
2010s in Gothenburg
Events in Gothenburg